Nina Weiss is a Chicago-area fine artist and teacher.

Weiss taught at the School of the Art Institute of Chicago and Columbia College Chicago for 18 years.  Weiss has taught painting, drawing and color classes & workshops in the Chicago area and around the USA. She takes students to Europe every summer to teach her European Landscape Painting and Drawing workshops.
Her work has appeared in The Chicago Art Scene. Artists Home & Studios and One Hundred Artists of the Midwest by E. Ashley Rooney. Her work has appeared in two Hollywood films and the television series "Chicago Fire". Exhibitions include New York Art Expo, J. Petter Galleries, Koehline Art Museum, Union League Cluc and more.

Weiss has taught three educational art videos, one for the Prismacolor company, and two for the online video company Bluprint. A third Bluprint painting video is due to be released early in August 2020.

Weiss received a Bachelor of Fine Arts in Painting from the Tyler School of Art, Temple University in Philadelphia. She attended graduate school at the University of Wisconsin–Madison starting in 1980.

References

Living people
Artists from Chicago
American women painters
Year of birth missing (living people)
University of Wisconsin–Madison alumni
Temple University alumni
21st-century American women artists